The 2002 Paris–Nice was the 60th edition of the Paris–Nice cycle race and was held from 10 March to 17 March 2002. The race started in Issy-les-Moulineaux and finished in Nice. The race was won by Alexander Vinokourov of the Telekom team.

General classification

References

2002
2002 in road cycling
2002 in French sport
March 2002 sports events in France